The 2018 Sarasota Open was a professional tennis tournament played on clay courts. It was the 10th edition of the tournament which was part of the 2018 ATP Challenger Tour. It took place in Sarasota, Florida, United States between 16 and 22 April.

Singles main-draw entrants

Seeds

 1 Rankings are as of April 9, 2018.

Other entrants
The following players received wildcards into the singles main draw:
  JC Aragone
  Sebastian Korda
  Mackenzie McDonald
  Tyler Zink

The following players received entry into the singles main draw as special exempts:
  Facundo Argüello
  Juan Ignacio Londero

The following players received entry from the qualifying draw:
  Jay Clarke
  Federico Coria
  Frank Dancevic
  Kaichi Uchida

The following player received entry as a lucky loser:
  Jan Choinski

Champions

Singles

 Hugo Dellien def.  Facundo Bagnis 2–6, 6–4, 6–2.

Doubles

 Evan King /  Hunter Reese def.  Christian Harrison /  Peter Polansky 6–1, 6–2.

External links
Official Website

2018 ATP Challenger Tour
2018
2018 in American tennis
2018 in sports in Florida